The 1979 Volvo International was a men's professional tennis tournament played on outdoor clay courts in North Conway, New Hampshire in the United States and was part of the 1979 Colgate-Palmolive Grand Prix. It was the 7th edition of the tournament and was held from July 30 through August 5, 1979. Fourth-seeded Harold Solomon won the singles title.

Finals

Singles

 Harold Solomon defeated  José Higueras 5–7, 6–4, 7–6
 It was Solomon's 2nd title of the year and the 18th of his career.

Doubles

 Ion Ţiriac /  Guillermo Vilas defeated  John Sadri /  Tim Wilkison 6–4, 7–6
 It was Ţiriac's 2nd title of the year and the 22nd of his career. It was Vilas' 4th title of the year and the 60th of his career.

References

External links
 ITF tournament edition details

 
Volvo International
Volvo International
Volvo International
Volvo International
Volvo International